Mzwakhe Nkosi is a South African professional rugby union football coach. He is currently the head coach of the  side that participates in the Currie Cup. He had previously coached the SA Schools side.

References

Living people
South African rugby union coaches
Year of birth missing (living people)